"Losing Sleep" is a song by English singer John Newman. The song was released on 13 December 2013 as the third single from his debut studio album, Tribute (2013). The song was written by John Newman, Steve Booker and Benny Blanco. The song peaked to number 48 on the UK Singles Chart and number 36 in Scotland.

Music video
A music video to accompany the release of "Losing Sleep" was first released onto YouTube on 26 November 2013 at a total length of four minutes and twenty-three seconds.

Critical reception
Robert Copsey of Digital Spy gave the song a positive review stating:

As if 2013 wasn't a good enough year for John Newman – he scored a number one album and single back in October – it's looking increasingly likely that things are only going to get bigger and better for him 2014. His debut single 'Love Me Again' has, unsurprisingly, started making waves in the US and recently entered the Billboard Hot 100, where it looks set for steady ascent. As such, you'd expect that he's been losing out on a few hours' kip in recent months, but it's actually a love interest that's causing him sleepless nights on his latest offering. "It's 3am, I'm calling in to tell you that without you here I'm losing sleep," he sings in his powerful yet gravely tone over militant handclaps and a moody, soul-pop piano line – before making a passionate plea for his lover not to forget about him. We hate to break it to you, John, but global fame doesn't come without difficult compromises.

Track listing

Credits and personnel
 Lead vocals – John Newman
 Lyrics – John Newman, Steve Booker and Benny Blanco
 Producers – John Newman, Mike Spencer, Ant Whiting and Steve Booker
 Label – Island

Chart performance

Weekly charts

Year-end charts

Release history

References

2013 singles
John Newman (singer) songs
2013 songs
Island Records singles
Songs written by Benny Blanco
Songs written by Steve Booker (producer)
Song recordings produced by Ant Whiting
Songs written by John Newman (singer)